The 2014–15 FIA Formula E Championship was the inaugural season of a new FIA championship for electrically powered cars. It began on 13 September 2014 at Beijing in China and finished on 28 June 2015 in London after eleven races. Nelson Piquet Jr. came first in the overall standings, and so became the first ever Formula E champion.

The car

For the first season, all teams were supplied an electric racing car built by Spark Racing Technology, called the Spark-Renault SRT 01E. The chassis was designed by Dallara, with an electric motor developed by McLaren (the same as that used in its P1 supercar), a battery system created by Williams Grand Prix Engineering and a Hewland five-speed gearbox. Michelin were the official tyre supplier. 42 electric cars were ordered by the FIA.

Teams and drivers
For the 2014–15 season, 10 teams contested the series. Each team fielded two drivers; each driver had two cars. That meant that 40 cars were required by the teams. All teams were ostensibly based at the sport's technical headquarters at the Donington Park race circuit, in the United Kingdom, although some teams had a greater presence there than others. Formula E organiser FEH itself has offices there for administration and operations staff.

All ten teams were confirmed to race in April 2014. However, in June 2014, Drayson Racing pulled out of the championship, with its entry taken by Trulli, a new team formed by former Formula One driver Jarno Trulli. Drayson entered the team in a supply and sponsorship arrangement, to be its principal technology partner.

Calendar

The season included 11 races, held between September 2014 and June 2015. The initial calendar had ten races and was approved by the FIA World Motor Sport Council in December 2013. However, in April 2014, changes were made to the calendar including dropping Rio de Janeiro, which had previously replaced Hong Kong, and moving the Los Angeles round to 4 April. On 3 February 2015, it was revealed that a race would be held in Moscow on 6 June to restore the calendar to its original schedule of ten races. On 19 February 2015, it was announced that the final round in London would be a double-header, expanding the calendar to eleven races.

Race results

Notes

Championship standings
Points system
Championship points were awarded as follows:

Each driver's lowest-scoring round was dropped from their total; however, rounds where the driver was excluded from the race could not be dropped.

Drivers' Championship

Notes
† – Drivers did not finish the race, but were classified as they completed more than 90% of the race distance.

Teams' Championship
The points system was the same as the Drivers' Championship, except that all rounds counted towards the total.

Notes
† – Drivers did not finish the race, but were classified as they completed more than 90% of the race distance.

References

External links

 

 
Formula E seasons
Formula E
Formula E
Formula E
Formula E